The Dead Boy Detectives are fictional supernatural detective duo who have appeared in comic books published by DC Comics' Vertigo imprint. They were created by writer Neil Gaiman and artists Matt Wagner and Malcolm Jones III in The Sandman #25 (April 1991). The characters are the ghosts of two dead children, Charles Rowland and Edwin Paine, who, rather than enter the afterlife, stay on Earth to become detectives investigating crimes involving the supernatural.

Sebastian Croft and Ty Tennant portray Rowland and Paine in the third season of the HBO Max series Doom Patrol.

Publication history
The characters were created by Gaiman and Wagner during the "Season of Mists" storyline in Sandman #25. In this story their origin is given as the two characters meet for the first time.

The story and characters are a macabre spin on two genres of British children's fiction - boarding school literature and teenage detective stories.

Gaiman revived the characters in the Children's Crusade, Vertigo's first and only crossover event, which ran through all that year's Vertigo annuals that were published between December 1993 and January 1994. Gaiman wrote the two Children's Crusade bookend annuals which prominently featured both characters and first gave them the official title the "Dead Boy Detectives". The characters also appeared in The Books of Magic short story in Winter's Edge #3, written by the then current writer Peter Gross.

In 2001 they received their own four-issue mini-series Sandman Presents: Dead Boy Detectives by writer Ed Brubaker and penciller Bryan Talbot. They have also made appearances in the ongoing series The Books of Magic, which was also based on a Neil Gaiman work.

Jill Thompson briefly depicted the characters in her graphic novel Death: At Death's Door, which retold the events of "Season of Mists" from Death's perspective. In 2005, the writer/artist later produced a manga-style graphic novel starring the characters, titled The Dead Boy Detectives.

The pair returned in the Vertigo Anthology series, a trio of one-shots published in 2012 that revived the DC anthology series Ghosts, Time Warp, and The Witching Hour. With a positive reception for their brief return and the revived interest in Neil Gaiman's Sandman due to the prequel, The Sandman: Overture, Vertigo published Dead Boy Detectives ongoing series written by Toby Litt and Mark Buckingham with art by Buckingham and Gary Erskine. The series ran for only 12 issues, published over the course of 2014.

Although the characters are children and their stories often involve other children and child-related themes, the four-issue mini-series carries the "suggested for mature readers" label. The 12-issue series is labelled "rated T Teen".

Plot summary
Edwin Paine was murdered at his boarding school in 1916, after which he went to Hell, where he was stalked by an unseen menace through a long corridor for several decades. During the Season of Mists storyline, published in December 1990, Hell was emptied of its residents. As a result of this, the boarding school was overrun by the souls of its past teachers and pupils who have escaped Hell. Charles Rowland was the sole living student at the school during these events, as all the other students had gone home for the holidays. A few of the teachers who stayed behind were supervising him, but one by one they fell victim to various horrors. Paine aided Rowland in avoiding most of the dangers, such as a murderous gang of students. Ultimately, however, Rowland did not survive. He next appeared as a ghost and decided to forego going to the afterlife with Death in preference for prospective future adventures with Paine.

The two ghosts next appear during the Children's Crusade crossover. In this story it is revealed that they have been studying the school's library books and films (mostly children's adventure fiction) in the hopes of learning how to become detectives. In their first case, they are hired by a young girl to discover what happened to the children of a small British town ("Flaxdown") who have all disappeared. This storyline connects to various other Vertigo titles, such as Swamp Thing, Animal Man, Doom Patrol, and Black Orchid. They were briefly seen tracking down the magician Tim Hunter whilst he was hiding out at one of the Inns Between the Worlds, but were captured and supposedly returned to Death's domain by a coachman - although the coachman actually promised to allow them to escape as he didn't force any spirit to return to death against its will.

In the 2001 limited series Sandman Presents: Dead Boy Detectives the two ghosts investigate the mystery of why and how numerous corpses of homeless children had begun washing up on the shores of the Thames.

In other media

Television
Sebastian Croft and Ty Tennant portrayed Payne and Rowland in the third season of the Doom Patrol TV series and they are in love with each other. The series also features their medium companion Crystal Palace, portrayed by Madalyn Horcher.
HBO Max has ordered a pilot for a potential Dead Boy Detectives series in September 2021. The pilot will be written by Steve Yockey, also acting as an executive producer alongside Jeremy Carver. The pilot will also feature Greg Berlanti, Sarah Schechter, and David Madden as executive producers under Berlanti Productions. The main cast for the pilot, as announced in November 2021, will be Jayden Revri as Edwin Payne, George Rexstrew as Charles Rowland, and Kassius Nelson as Crystal Palace. The series was picked up by HBO Max for an eight-episode first season in April 2022. Additional cast members include Briana Cuoco as Jenny the Butcher, Yuyu Kitamura as Niko, Jenn Lyon as Esther, and Ruth Connell reprising her Doom Patrol role of Night Nurse. In September 2022, Lukas Gage was cast in a recurring capacity as Cat King. In October 2022, Michael Beach, Joshua Colley and Lindsey Gort were cast as Tragic Mick, Monty and Maxine respectively. On February 23, 2023, the series was announced to be moving from HBO Max to Netflix.

References

2001 comics debuts
2005 comics debuts
Comics by Bryan Talbot
DC Comics undead characters
Fantasy comics
Fictional amateur detectives
Fictional ghosts
Fictional LGBT characters in television
The Books of Magic
The Sandman (comic book)
Vertigo Comics limited series
Gothic comics